Eskelisen Lapinlinjat is a bus transport company operating in Finland. The company specialises in long-distance connections in Lapland.

Eskelisen Lapinlinjat is the most famous public bus transport company in Lappish tourism travel. Most of the lines operated by the company start all the way south from either Helsinki or Turku, and continue northwards to Oulu and Rovaniemi. From there, the lines continue northwest to Kilpisjärvi and Tromsø or north towards Utsjoki and Nordkapp. The company is the only public bus company in Finland to serve routes to Norwegian Lapland. Because a complete trip from Helsinki or Turku to Tromsø takes about 23 hours, the company can only afford a single trip per day.

Routes
All serviced routes share a common route section Oulu - Pudasjärvi - Ranua - Rovaniemi.

Routes from the south to Oulu:
 Main route: Helsinki - Lahti - Heinola - Jyväskylä - Hirvaskangas - Oulu
 Western route (used occasionally): Turku - Rauma - Pori - Vaasa - Raahe - Oulu

Routes northwards from Rovaniemi:
 Western route: Rovaniemi - Lohiniva - Kolari - Olos - Muonio - Palojoensuu - Karesuvanto - Kilpisjärvi - Skibotn - Nordkjosbotn - Tromsø
 Central route: Rovaniemi - Sodankylä - Vuotso - Saariselkä - Ivalo - Inari - Kaamanen
 Western central route: Kaamanen - Karigasniemi - Karasjok - Lakselv - Nordkapp
 Central central route: Kaamanen - Utsjoki - Skipagurra - Vadsø
 Eastern central route: Kaamanen - Kirkenes

External links
 Official site

Tourism in Finland
Road transport in Finland
Bus companies of Finland